Church of Saint Michael is a Roman Catholic church in Olomouc, Czech Republic. It is one of the most important landmarks of the city.

The church, connected originally with the Dominican Order, was constructed in the 13th century, and reconstructed to its current Baroque form from 1676 to 1703 by Giovanni Pietro Tencalla. Stucco ornamentation for the interior was provided by Baltazar Fontana. The church was consecrated on 9 May 1707; however in July 1709, it was damaged by a large fire.

The church is characterised by its three domes symbolizing the Holy Trinity. The underside of each domes is frescoed. The church organ is original from 1706, made by David Sieber, an organist from Brno.

External links 

 Official website of the parish 

Churches in Olomouc
Roman Catholic churches in the Czech Republic
Church buildings with domes